Brian Spencer George Lambert (22 November 1930 – 22 December 2019), commonly known as Bill Lambert, was a New Zealand politician of the National Party.

Biography

Lambert was born in 1930, the son of Basil Lambert. He received his education at Silverstream College. He worked as a journalist for The Dominion and was afterwards public relations officer for Mobil Oil (1956–1960). He worked as public relations manager for Feltex Carpets (1961–1966), and was then a ministerial press officer (1966–1969). He then went into private business and was manager for Forum PR Ltd (1969–1972), and manager for Extra Media Services (1972–1975) in Wellington.

On 16 November 1957, he married June, the daughter of Hector Hailwood. They had four sons.

At the 1971 local elections he stood as a candidate for the Lower Hutt City Council on mayor John Kennedy-Good's Combined Team ticket, but was unsuccessful. He represented the Hutt Valley electorate of Western Hutt from 1975 to 1978, when he was defeated by Labour's John Terris.

Lambert died in Porirua on 22 December 2019.

Notes

References

New Zealand National Party MPs
1930 births
2019 deaths
Members of the New Zealand House of Representatives
New Zealand MPs for Hutt Valley electorates
Unsuccessful candidates in the 1978 New Zealand general election
People educated at St. Patrick's College, Silverstream